Mtwivila is an administrative ward in the Iringa Urban district of the Iringa Region of Tanzania. In 2016 the Tanzania National Bureau of Statistics report there were 11,174 people in the ward, from 21,017 in 2012.

Neighborhoods 
The ward has 10 neighborhoods.

 Dodoma Road "C"
 Dodoma Road "D"
 Dodoma Road "E"
 Idunda
 Mtwivila "C"
 Mtwivila 'A'
 Mtwivila 'B'
 Mwautwa
 Semkini
 Viziwi

References 

Wards of Iringa Region